Particularism may refer to:

 Epistemological particularism, one of the answers to the problem of the criterion in epistemology
 Historical particularism, an approach in anthropology
 Moral particularism, the view that there are no universal moral principles
 Multicultural particularism, the belief that a common culture for all people is either undesirable or impossible
 Political particularism, the politics of group identity that trumps universal rights
 Religious particularism, name given to the phenomenon of Americanism in the apostolic letter Testem benevolentiae nostrae